The 2020 Arizona Democratic presidential primary took place on March 17, 2020, the third primary Tuesday of the month, as one of three contests on the same day in the Democratic Party primaries for the 2020 presidential election, while the contest in Ohio had been postponed for roughly a month. The closed primary allocated 80 delegates towards the 2020 Democratic National Convention, of which 67 were pledged delegates allocated according to the results of the primary.

Three major candidates ran in the primary, including former vice president Joe Biden, senator Bernie Sanders from Vermont, and representative Tulsi Gabbard from Hawaii's 2nd district. 12 other candidates who withdrew prior to the contest were also on the ballot, along with three minor candidates. Biden won the primary, with almost 44% of the vote and 38 delegates, while Sanders came in second place with almost 33% of the vote and 29 delegates. In a distant third was former mayor Michael Bloomberg, who came close to 10%, even though he had suspended his campaign nearly two weeks before and had issued an official withdrawal with the state, still remaining on the ballot.

Biden won 13 of 15 counties, with the exception of Coconino and Yuma, and 7 of 9 congressional districts. Key to his victory were white voters, whom he won 51-32 per CNN exit polls, and suburban voters, who he won 53–32. In a stark contrast from 2016, Sanders' strength was reliant primarily on non-white and Hispanic voters, whom Biden won by only 47-45 and 45–44, respectively. Biden would ultimately win the state of Arizona in the general election by 10,457 votes, making him the first Democrat to win it since Bill Clinton in 1996 and only the second since Harry Truman did so in 1948.

Procedure 

Arizona was one of three states holding primaries on March 17, 2020, alongside Florida and Illinois, while only one day before Ohio had been the first state to postpone its primary due to the COVID-19 pandemic and cancel in-person voting, accepting ballots until April 28 instead.

Voters had to have registered as Democrats by February 18 to be eligible for voting in the primary. Arizona mailed ballots to voters on the permanent early voting list. Ballots had to be received by 7:00 p.m. on March 17, 2020. In addition, some Arizona counties offered early voting sites, where any voter could walk in and vote in person, Monday to Friday, from February 19 through March 13, 2020. Voting took place from 6:00 a.m. until 7:00 p.m MST. In the closed primary, candidates had to meet a threshold of 15 percent at the congressional district or statewide level in order to be considered viable for delegates. The 67 pledged delegates to the 2020 Democratic National Convention were allocated proportionally on the basis of the results of the primary. Of these, between 3 and 6 were allocated to each of the state's 9 congressional districts and another 9 were allocated to party leaders and elected officials (PLEO delegates), in addition to 14 at-large delegates. As a March primary on Stage I of the primary timetable Arizona received no bonus delegates, in order to disperse the primaries between more different date clusters and keep too many states from hoarding on a March date.

District caucuses were held on April 18, 2020, to designate national convention district delegates. The state convention and state committee meeting were subsequently held on May 16, 2020, to vote on the 14 at-large and 9 pledged PLEO delegates for the Democratic National Convention. The delegation also included 13 unpledged PLEO delegates: 7 members of the Democratic National Committee and 6 members of Congress (one senator and 5 representatives).

Candidates
The following candidates appeared on the ballot in Arizona. Candidates that had filed a formal withdrawal with the office remained on the ballot because it had already been printed but their votes were not individually published in the final canvass, making them effectively ineligible.

Running

Joe Biden
Roque De La Fuente III
Michael Ellinger
Tulsi Gabbard
Henry Hewes
Bernie Sanders

Withdrawn

Pete Buttigieg
Julian Castro
Deval Patrick
Elizabeth Warren
Marianne Williamson
Andrew Yang

Formal withdrawal (ineligible)

Michael Bennet
Michael Bloomberg
Cory Booker
John Delaney
Amy Klobuchar
Tom Steyer

Polling

Results

By county

By congressional district

Analysis 
Arizona was a hotly contested state throughout both the primary and general election seasons due to its rapidly diversifying electorate. A high concentration of Hispanic and Latino voters as well as an intense swing to the left in suburban areas and the Republican Party having moved to the right, strengthened Democratic support while drawing new divides in the Democratic Party. In 2016, Hillary Clinton defeated Bernie Sanders by a 14.9% margin; despite Sanders being trailing Biden significantly nationwide, he actually improved on his performance in Arizona in 2020, losing it by an 11.0% margin. This improvement was mostly attributable to improvements among Hispanic and Latino voters: Sanders performed well among that demographic throughout the primary as opposed to 2016, when Clinton handily carried regions with high densities of Hispanic voters. Per CNN exit polls, Biden won Hispanic voters 45-44 compared to white voters, who he won 51–32. Sanders won Yuma County, where 64.6% of the population are Hispanic or Latino, as well as Arizona's 3rd and 7th congressional districts; the former, home to Tucson, Yuma, and most of the southern border, is 65.1% Hispanic, while the latter, composing much of inner Phoenix, is 64.0% Hispanic. Nonetheless, Biden's performance represented a significant improvement among voters of these demographics from earlier in the primary, which was compounded by a strong performance in the state's suburbs. He won Maricopa County, which holds Phoenix and 61.6% of the population, by 33,328 votes, largely due to the Phoenix suburbs, which have been reliably Republican since the 1950s but have recently shifted to the left. He also won Pima County, the second largest county and home to Tucson, by 17,668 votes.

The results of the primary would be reflected in the general election: Biden would end up winning Arizona by 10,457 votes, the first Democrat to do so since Bill Clinton in 1996 and only the second since Harry S. Truman in 1948. He would also become the first to win crucial Maricopa County since Truman. His performance in predominantly-Hispanic areas in urban areas and along the southern border would also decline compared to 2016, though would be supplemented by a raw increase in voter turnout.

Notes

References

External links
The Green Papers delegate allocation summary
Arizona Democratic Party delegate selection plan
FiveThirtyEight Arizona primary poll tracker

Arizona Democratic
Democratic Presidential Preference Election
2020